Japan has the second largest music market in the world. In 1962, Tokushin music reports was founded and became the leading provider of music sales in Japan. However their reports and charts are only available to industry insiders and are not available to the general public. In 1968 Original Confidence was established and began providing music charts to the general public with data collected from various retailers throughout Japan.

This is the list of the best-selling singles, based on the data by Oricon. It does not include singles that were released before 1968, and is only from data collected from Oricon's retail partners and not the record companies.

Best-selling physical singles in Japan 
Guinness World Records certified that Masato Shimon's "Oyoge! Taiyaki-kun" is the best-selling single in Japan.

There were several singles which achieved worldwide success. Shoukichi Kina's "Subete No Hito No Kokoro Ni Hana Wo" sold estimate 30 million copies over worldwide. Kyu Sakamoto's "Sukiyaki" sold estimate 13 million copies over worldwide. However, those were worldwide sales.

There were many non full-track digital download singles in Japan. Hikaru Utada's "Flavor of Life" sold over 7.7 million combined sales. GReeeeN's "Ai Uta" sold 5 million digital download singles. However, those included the sales of non full-track digital download singles. Guinness World Records certified that Thelma Aoyama's "Soba ni Iru ne" is the best-selling full-track digital download single in Japan with over 8 million copies.

Machiko Soga's "Oba-Q Ondo" sold estimate 2 million single and 4 million sonosheet in Japan. However, a sonosheet was not a regular 7-inch single.

Yujiro Ishihara & Shunko Makimura's "Ginza No Koi No Monogatari" (1961) sold estimate 3.35 million copies in Japan. Hiroshi Wada & His Mahina Stars's "Ozashiki Kouta" (1964) sold estimate 3 million copies in Japan. Yūzō Kayama's "Kimi to Itsumademo" (1965) sold estimate 3 million copies in Japan. However, those were released before 1968 in Japan.

List of best-selling singles based on physical sales
The following list covers the highest-selling singles in the country based on physical sales compiled by Oricon since its foundation in November 1967.

Notes:
  Released along with popular B-side "Love Story wa Totsuzen ni".
  Released as a double A-side single along with "Yume no Bannin".
  Released as a double A-side single along with "Time Will Tell".

List of best-selling singles by Western acts

Since the creation of the Oricon Singles Chart in November 1967, only three singles released by acts of Western origin have become million sellers. The following list covers the top-selling singles released by such acts in Japan, based on physical sales only.

Notes:
  According to Sony Music Entertainment Japan, "To Love You More" sold 1.5 million copies in the country.
  Originally released in 1984, reissued in 1993.
  Released as a double A-side single along with "Top of the World".

Best-selling multi-format singles in Japan 
With over 9.2 million combined sales, Thelma Aoyama's "Soba ni Iru ne" is the best-selling multi-format single in Japan.

Over 5 million copies

Over 4 million copies

Over 3 million copies 

Note:

Over 2 million copies 

Note:

Best-selling singles by year 
The following is a table of the yearly  best-selling singles in Japan by physical sales.

See also
 J-pop
 List of best-selling albums in Japan
 Oricon
 Oricon Singles Chart
 Oricon Albums Chart

References

External links 
 Oricon official site
 Yamachan Land|Single Chart Daijiten
 List of best selling singles 1968-2006
 List of number one international hit singles in Japan
 
 List of highest selling international singles by years
 Database on Japanese Elton John fan site

Best selling singles in Japan
Japan
Best selling singles in Japan